Girls Gone Wild or Girl Gone Wild may refer to:

 Girls Gone Wild (1929 film), a 1929 film produced and released by Fox Film Corporation
 Girls Gone Wild (franchise), a pornographic entertainment franchise, 1997
 "Girls Gone Wild", a song by Baby Bash
 "Girls Gone Wild", a song by Captain Ahab
 "Girls Gone Wild", a song by DJ Antoine
 "Girls Gone Wild", a song by Inner Circle from The Best of Inner Circle
 "Girls Gone Wild", a song by Jagged Edge
 "Girls Gone Wild", a song by Lee Kernaghan from the album Planet Country
 "Girls Gone Wild", a 2006 song by Ludacris from the album Release Therapy
 "Girl Gone Wild", a song by Madonna
 Girls Gone Mild, a 2007 book on self-respect by Wendy Shalit

See also 
 Gone Wild (disambiguation)